Kevin Andrew Ross (born June 1, 1963) is an American host of the syndicated court show America's Court with Judge Ross, a podcaster, producer, writer, and former judge on the Los Angeles County Superior Court in California.

Biography

Early Years
A Los Angeles native, Ross attended Gardena High School, where he was student body president and president of the District-Wide Association of Student Councils for the Los Angeles Unified School District. He went on to become student body vice president and later president of Morehouse College, graduating from the Atlanta HBCU with a degree in Political Science. Ross received his Juris Doctor from Southwestern Law School. There, he continued in various leadership roles, including class president and chapter president of the National Black Law Students Association. Ross also became a member of the African-American Greek-lettered fraternity Kappa Alpha Psi.

Law and Politics
An internship working for the Los Angeles County District Attorney's Office at the height of the crack cocaine epidemic convinced Ross that victims and those living in underserved communities needed advocates to represent their interests. He decided to become a deputy district attorney, and later worked as a hardcore gang prosecutor responsible for implementing controversial civil gang nuisance injunctions.

Ross entered politics in 1995, running for a seat on the Los Angeles City Council, finishing third despite endorsements from the Los Angeles Times and LA Weekly publications. He was subsequently appointed to the LA County Parks and Recreation Commission, and co-founded The New Leaders, an organization created to train and prepare the next generation of African-American leaders.

Initial Media Employment
Ross began contributing op-ed pieces for the New York Times, Los Angeles Times, Los Angeles Sentinel and Los Angeles Daily News. He was named co-host of "The People's Connection" on 103.9 KACE, before being given his own show on Disney's KTZN 710 The Zone. Ross later hosted and produced a weekend program on Talkradio 790 KABC until he retired to begin his judicial career.

Election to the California Bench and Subsequent Removal
While attending law school, Ross clerked for David W. Williams. A fellow black Republican, Judge Williams would administer the oath of office to Ross after he became a judge on the then Inglewood Municipal Court. At that time, Ross was the youngest elected judge in the state of California.

Ross was elevated the following year to the Superior Court after a ballot measure approved by California voters. During his seven years on the bench, Ross handled over 60,000 matters, ranging from traffic and small claims cases, to juvenile delinquents, sexually violent predators and murderers. After being profiled on KCET's Life & Times Tonight, Ross began appearing on the PBS program to discuss legal issues from a judge's perspective. He also frequently spoke about the importance of Blacks becoming police officers, prosecutors, defense attorneys and judges to ensure the judicial system treated minorities fairly.

In 2005 the Commission on Judicial Performance (CJP) removed Judge Ross from office, stating he violated judicial canons pertaining to defendants' constitutional rights, public comments made on KCET, and his involvement in a television court show pilot.  Ross unsuccessfully appealed the CJP's decision to the California Supreme Court, a ruling that also made him ineligible to practice law in the state. Neither the initial Endemol and Tribune Entertainment produced "Mobile Court", nor the follow-up Twentieth Television program "Ross is Boss", was picked up by television stations for syndication.

Return to Media
Reigniting his interest in media, Ross decided to start a communications company, become a blogger, and launch an eponymous  Internet show on Blogtalkradio, a large citizen broadcasting network. "The Kevin Ross Show" became a leading current events and conservative political show on Blogtalkradio. It also ranked among the top five most popular shows on the social networking radio site.

In 2008, Fox News Radio and BlogTalkRadio partnered to bring listeners "Election 2008: Battle of the Blog Talkers." Fans of FOX News Radio's "FOX Across America" selected their favorite BlogTalkRadio hosts from each side of the political spectrum during a weeklong, one-on-one tournament. Ross was chosen as one of the eight hosts, and ultimately won the contest representing the political right.

At a 2009 business meeting with comedian Byron Allen to discuss an online media venture, Allen was so impressed with Ross that he made him a deal right on the spot to host what would be the first of six court shows for Entertainment Studios (ES). The following year, "America's Court with Judge Ross" was among the 2010-2011 crop of freshman programs in daytime. Entering its thirteenth season in September 2022, America's Court can also be seen on Justice Central, ES’ legal cable network.

Ross’ acting credits include appearing as the judge in independent films ”Blindfire” and ”Broken Star” ”, and an episode of Bounce TV’s comedy series ”In The Cut”. Additionally, the Netflix release ”Ava (2020 film)”  features Ross presiding over an America's Court case.

Entrepreneurship
Along with serving as one of the executive producers on the Emmy nominated America's Court, Ross hosts Kevin Ross The Podcast on TheGrio's Black Podcast Network. He appears on various cable and radio outlets such as Fox News, MSNBC, CNN, Black Entertainment Television (BET), NPR, and KJLH 102.3 FM as a legal, political and social commentator.

Personal
Kevin Ross is married with two sons and resides in the Los Angeles area.

See also
 Black conservatism in the United States

References

External links 
America's Court With Judge Ross Show
Kevin Ross on Twitter
TheGrio's Kevin Ross The Podcast 

1963 births
Living people
African-American judges
African-American lawyers
African-American television personalities
American bloggers
American prosecutors
American radio personalities
Businesspeople from California
Morehouse College alumni
Lawyers from Los Angeles
Southwestern Law School alumni
Television judges
California state court judges
Municipal judges in the United States
Gardena High School alumni
21st-century African-American writers
20th-century African-American people